Jim Allen is an Australian archaeologist specialising in the archaeology of the South Pacific.

Allen led the first professional excavation of a European site in Australia, the 1840s military settlement of Victoria, which was established at Port Essington at the northernmost point of the Northern Territory. He also worked on the Lapita culture, tracing the expansion of Polynesian settlement through its distinctive pottery style. In the 1990s, he played a prominent role in the debate over the forced repatriation of Aboriginal remains.

Allen was the Foundation Professor of Department of Archaeology at La Trobe University from 1985 to 1993. Prior to that, he taught in the department of prehistory at the Australian National University. From 1993, he was a professorial fellow of the Australian Research Council and research associate at La Trobe. In 2012 he was elected a foreign associate of the United States National Academy of Sciences.

In 2018, by then a Professor Emeritus, Allen co-authored a paper showing evidence of earlier-that- expected arrival of humans in Australia.

References

Further reading 
Australian archaeologist: collected papers in honour of Jim Allen / edited by Atholl Anderson & Tim Murray, Coombs Academic Publishing, ANU 2000
Allen, J. (1984). "In Search of the Lapita Homeland: Reconstructing the Prehistory of the Bismarck Archipelago". Journal of Pacific History (19/4): 186–187.

 

Living people
Year of birth missing (living people)
Australian archaeologists
Foreign associates of the National Academy of Sciences